William George Evans (born 9 October 1991) is an English professional footballer who plays for Boreham Wood.

Career
Evans played for Fairford Town and then Cricklade before joining Swindon Town and progressing through their Centre of Excellence. He signed his first professional contract in April 2010, after captaining the youth and reserve sides throughout the 2009–10 season. He made his professional debut in a 3–0 Football League Trophy victory at Southampton on 31 August 2010.

After spending three months on loan with Hereford United where he made 6 appearances he joined Hereford permanently in January 2012 on a free transfer.

On 6 March 2012, Evans scored the fastest goal in Hereford United history in a 2–2 draw at Macclesfield Town. He lashed home a spectacular 25-yarder fractionally inside 12 seconds at Moss Rose before scoring a second goal from outside the penalty area after 26 minutes. The game was Richard O'Kelly's first match in charge of the Bulls having taken over from Jamie Pitman a day earlier. Evans broke the record that had stood since the 1991–92 campaign when Peter Heritage netted after 14 seconds in a home game against Lincoln City.

On 31 January 2013 Evans joined Conference National rivals Newport County on loan until the end of the 2012–13 season. He was eventually released by parent club Hereford at the end of the season and signed for Eastleigh.

On 26 May 2016, Evans signed for Aldershot Town on a one-year deal.

On 29 May 2018, Evans joined National League rivals Chesterfield, on a two-year deal.

On 5 January 2019 Evans scored an injury time equaliser as Chesterfield came back from 3-0 down to draw level at 3–3 with Ebbsfleet United. Evans then had to go in goal for Chesterfield when Callum Burton was sent off in the 95th minute. Evans saved the resultant penalty from Burton's indiscretion, taken by Ebbsfleet striker Michael Cheek, to maintain the draw for his side. Evans was released by Chesterfield at the end of the 2020–21 season.

On 1 July 2021, Evans joined Boreham Wood on a two-year deal.

Career statistics

References

External links

1991 births
Living people
Sportspeople from Swindon
English footballers
Association football midfielders
Fairford Town F.C. players
Cricklade Town F.C. players
Swindon Town F.C. players
Hereford United F.C. players
Newport County A.F.C. players
Eastleigh F.C. players
Aldershot Town F.C. players
Chesterfield F.C. players
Boreham Wood F.C. players
English Football League players
National League (English football) players